Blessed James may refer to:

James Thompson
James Duckett
James of Sandomierz
James Salomoni
Santiago Mestre Iborra
Jakob Gapp
Jakob Franz Alexander Kern
James Alberione
Jacques Ghazir Haddad
Giacomo Cusmano